Max Schönherr (23 November 190313 December 1984) was an Austrian composer, arranger and conductor.

Biography

Born in Maribor, Schönherr studied in Graz under Roderich Mojsisovics von Mojsvar and was a composer of light orchestral music in Vienna. He died  in Baden bei Wien. Outside his native country, Schönherr was best known for his Austrian Peasant Dances Op. 14, which became widely popular internationally. His other compositions include a Concertino for Piano and small Orchestra, Festive Musical for Piano and small Orchestra, Dances of Salzburg for small or salon orchestra, Perpetual Motion Op. 29", Das Trünkene Mucklein, and the ballet Hotel Sacher.

Modern recordings of his work are limited to two CDs, conducted by Manfred Müssauer with the Donau Philharmonie Wien and released in 2006-7; as well as a 2-CD Introduction to his work on the Orf (Liebermann) label, consisting of older recordings. There are also a number of examples of Schönherr's work as a conductor available on disc.

Older records include a 78rpm recording (HMV C. 2905) from the late 1940s entitled Austrian Peasant Dances, which has Schönherr as the arranger: the conductor is Walter Goehr and the orchestra is listed generically as Symphony Orchestra. A well-known 1963 LP from RCA Victor (Dynagroove LSC-2677) featuring Arthur Fiedler and the Boston Pops Orchestra entitled Concert in the Park, features a Wedding March not found on HMV C. 2905; whilst that recording contains two dances not recorded on the RCA LP. The most extended recording was by Henry Krips and the Philharmonia Orchestra, recorded in 1958, comprising Hochzeitsmarsch aus Ebensee, Schuhplattler, Gugga Polka, Salzburger Schustertanz, Gstrampfter, Polsterltanz aus Ischl, Sautanz, and Bauerngalopp.

 References 

 Max Schönherr, The Concise Grove Dictionary of Music'', Oxford University Press, 1994

1903 births
1984 deaths
20th-century Austrian people
20th-century Austrian composers
Austrian male composers
Austrian composers
Male conductors (music)
Musicians from Maribor
20th-century Austrian conductors (music)
20th-century Austrian male musicians